Dan George (born 10 August 1986) is a Welsh rugby union player. After beginning his career in the back row, he moved to hooker where he represented Wales at under-16, under-18, under-19 and under-21 levels. He played for Llanelli RFC and the Scarlets before joining London Welsh in 2008.

On 28 June 2013, following London Welsh's relegation to the RFU Championship, George left the club to join Gloucester Rugby in the Premiership on a one-year deal for the 2013–14 season. On 29 April 2014, George joined local rivals Worcester Warriors in the RFU Championship for the 2014–15 season.

After two years at Worcester, George left to seek work in London and played for Blackheath. Christmas of 2017 saw a move back to the professional game with Bedford Blues, after six months a move to London Scottish developed as a player-coach overseeing the forwards.

References

External links
Worcester Warriors Profile
Gloucester Rugby Profile

Welsh rugby union players
Llanelli RFC players
Scarlets players
1986 births
Living people
Rugby union hookers